Ioannis Gklavakis (Greek: Ιωάννης Γκλαβάκης) (born 10 October 1949, in Thessaloniki)
is a Greek politician. From 2004 to 2009 he was Member of the European Parliament (MEP) with the New Democracy, part of the European People's Party and sat on the European Parliament's Committee on Agriculture and Rural Development and its Committee on Fisheries.

He was also a vice-chair of the Delegation to the EU-Mexico Joint Parliamentary Committee.

Education
 1973: Graduate of Agronomy Faculty of Aristotle University of Thessaloniki

Career
 from 1976: Nursery owner
 since 2003: Sole representative for Greece of the Italian Horticultural Research Centre (C.R.P.V.)
 1984–2003: Board member of the Pan-Hellenic Confederation of Agricultural Cooperative Associations (PASEGES)
 2002–2003: PASEGES Board Chairman (1990) and Vice-Chairman
 1997–2004: Member of the New Democracy Central Committee
 1990–1994: Member of the Aridaiai Municipal Council
 1994–2000: Member of the Pella Prefectural Council
 1981–2003: Chairman of the Pella Association of Nursery Gardeners
 1990–1993: Member of Greek Nurseries Technical Committee (1983–2004) Board Member of the Thessaloniki International Exhibition
 2003–2004: Board Member of the Greek Agricultural Research Institute (2001–2004), Vice-Chairman of the Greek Market Garden Society

See also
 2004 European Parliament election in Greece

External links
 
 
 Media appearance of Gklavakis in the news regarding Turkish potatoes

1949 births
Living people
Politicians from Thessaloniki
New Democracy (Greece) MEPs
MEPs for Greece 2004–2009
Aristotle University of Thessaloniki alumni